Solférino was the second and last ship of the  of broadside ironclads built for the French Navy in the early 1860s.

These two ironclads were the only two-decked broadside ironclad battleships ever built. They were also the first ships in the world to be equipped with a spur ram.

Design and description
The Magenta class were two-decked ironclad ships of the line, much as the preceding  were armored versions of traditional frigates. The ship displaced  . The Magentas were equipped with a metal-reinforced, spur-shaped ram, the first ironclads to be fitted with a ram, and they had a crew of 674 officers and enlisted men.

The Magenta-class ships had a single two-cylinder horizontal-return connecting-rod compound steam engine that drove the propeller shaft, using steam provided by eight boilers.

Armament and protection
The main battery of the Magenta class consisted of sixteen  Modèle 1858–60 smoothbore muzzle-loading guns, thirty-four  Modèle 1858–60 rifled muzzle-loading (RML) guns and a pair of  RML howitzers on two gun decks. All of the 194 mm guns and ten of the 164.7 mm guns were mounted on the lower gun deck on the broadside. The remaining 164.7 mm guns and the 225 mm howitzers were positioned on the upper gun deck; the former on the broadside, but the latter were placed on pivot mounts as chase guns fore and aft. In the late 1860s all of the guns on the lower gun deck were removed and their armament was changed to four  RMLs and eight 194 mm smoothbores, two each of the latter fore and aft as chase guns on the upper gun deck. Their final armament consisted of ten 240 mm Modèle 1864–66 guns and four 194 mm guns as chase guns fore and aft.

Construction and service
Solférino, named after the French victory in the Battle of Solferino, was laid down on 24 June 1859 by the Arsenal de Lorient, launched on 24 June 1861 and commissioned on 25 August 1862.

Citations

Bibliography

External links 

 Plans of the Solférino (large TIF files) from the Atlas du génie maritime of the ''Service historique de la Défense" ("Historical services of the ministry of Defence")
 Plan of the hull
 Cargo bay and machinery
 2nd battery and castle
 1st battery
 Riggings

Magenta-class ironclads
Ships built in France
1861 ships